Ruth Stewart is a singer.

Ruth Stewart may also refer to:

Ruth Stewart (Home and Away), Home and Away character
Ruthie Stewart, character in Hannah Montana
Ruth Stuart, writer
Ruth-Marie Stewart, American skier